Seaman High School is a public secondary school in Topeka, Kansas, United States.  It serves students from grades 9 to 12. It is operated by Seaman USD 345 school district, which covers 84 square miles of northern Topeka and rural Shawnee County, Kansas.   The high school is one of the few in the world where the students operate a chartered bank.

History

Seaman High School was founded in 1920, opening to students in grades nine through twelve on October 4 of that year.  The school is named for Fred A. Seaman, who was integral in the school's founding and served as its first principal. Despite his open affiliation with the Ku Klux Klan as an Exalted Cyclops and district organizer, he became the school's namesake following a vote by students and their parents. Seaman High School's initial enrollment was 65 students, who were taught by seven faculty members. Seaman was one of the first three rural high schools in Kansas. Five students were in the first graduating class. 

The Seaman Bank, the first high school bank in the United States, was founded in 1927.

In November 1954, Seaman High moved into a new school located one-half mile west of the former school.  Enrollment in 1958 was 483 students.  Twenty-two teachers were on the faculty. In December 1970, the new high school at 4850 NW Rochester Rd was dedicated. The former structure at 1124 NW Lyman now houses Logan Elementary School. The school was selected as a Blue Ribbon School in 1984. The Blue Ribbon Award recognizes public and private schools which perform at high levels or have made significant academic improvements.

In January 2008, construction was completed of a freshman wing on the current building along with additions to the auditorium and the woods and metal shops.  In August 2008, ninth grade, which had previously been moved to the Junior High level, was added back to the school.

In 2017, Seaman High hosted a "community conversation" discussing inappropriate online behavior, harassment, and threats. Students were encouraged to report negative online behavior, and several student groups began to raise awareness around this issue.

In 2018, Seaman High School's swim team became the first swim team in Topeka to win a state championship, winning by 150 points.

In October 2020, research by Seaman High School's student newspaper revealed that Seaman had been a leader within the Ku Klux Klan. The district's board confirmed this and stated that they were "aware of Fred Seaman’s affiliation with the Ku Klux Klan through research conducted by our teachers and students" and are "proud of our teachers and students for taking a strong interest and stance in learning about and identifying historical figures."

Extracurricular activities
The Vikings are classified as a 5A school, the second-largest classification in Kansas according to the Kansas State High School Activities Association. Throughout its history, Seaman has won several state championships in various sports.

Athletics
Seaman High School offers the following sports:

Fall
 Football
 Volleyball
 Boys Cross-Country
 Girls Cross-Country
 Girls Golf
 Boys Soccer
 Girls Tennis
 Cheerleading

Winter
 Boys Basketball
 Girls Basketball
 Wrestling
 Boys Bowling
 Girls Bowling
 Winter Cheerleading
 Boys Swimming and Diving

Spring
 Baseball
 Boys Golf
 Boys Tennis
 Girls Soccer
 Girls Swimming and Diving
 Softball
 Boys Track and Field
 Girls Track and Field

Activities
Seaman's activities include 
 Band
 Cheerleading
 Choir
 Show Choir
 Debate & Forensics
 Jazz Band
 Orchestra
 Scholar's Bowl
 Student Council
 Vikettes (Dance squad)
 Model UN

Clubs
Seaman's clubs include 
 Book Club
 Viking Voices (Writing Club)
 FCA
 French Club
 German Club
 Literary Magazine
 Math Club
 Sharp
 Spanish Club
 Spirit Club
 FBLA
 Young Democrats
 Civic Engagement Club
 GSA

Organizations
Seaman's organizations include 
 FBLA
 FCCLA
 FFA
 Interact Club
 Key Club
 NGHS
 NHS
 SADD
 SEAMAPP
 International Thespian Society

Notable alumni
 Rick DeHart - former MLB player (Montreal Expos, Kansas City Royals)
 Wes Jackson - founder and current president of The Land Institute

See also

 List of high schools in Kansas
 List of unified school districts in Kansas

References

External links
 

Public high schools in Kansas
Schools in Shawnee County, Kansas
Educational institutions established in 1927
Education in Topeka, Kansas
1927 establishments in Kansas